{{Infobox darts player
| name = Geert De Vos
| image = 
| fullname = 
| nickname = "Foxy"
| birth_date = 
| birth_place = Ninove, Belgium
| death_date = 
| death_place = 
| hometown = Aalst, Belgium
| since = 
| darts = 24g Grand Slam Geert De Vos
| laterality = Right-handed
| music = "Because the Night" by Patti Smith Group
| BDO = 2005-2018
| PDC = 2021-2022
| currentrank = 
| BDO World = Quarter Final: 2017
| World Masters = Last 16: 2013, 2016
| Int. Darts League =
| Zuiderduin Masters = Semi Final: 2014, 2016
| World Darts Trophy = Winner (1) 2015
| PDC World = 
| Matchplay = 
| Grand Prix = 
| Grand Slam = Group Stages: 2015
| UK Open = Last 128: 2022
| Vegas = 
| European = 
| Premier League = 
| US Open = 
| results = {{aligned table|leftright=y|fullwidth=y|class=nowrap
|Belgium Gold Cup|2006
|Bruges Open|2017
|England Open|2017
|Estonian Open|2014
|French Open|2016
|German Open|2012, 2013
|Hal Masters|2016
|Spring Cup|2007, 2012
||2010
}}
| achievement = East Flanders Open 2014Open Zeeland 2016 
}}Geert De Vos (born 6 October 1981) is a Belgian darts player. His nickname is "Foxy'''".

Career

In 2012, De Vos qualified for the first time for BDO World Darts Championship; this performance led to a wildcard for the Zuiderduin Masters. During this tournament, he lost his first match against the eventual winner Scott Waites 5–3.

During the World Championship, De Vos played Tony West, the eleventh seed. The match was won by De Vos 3–1. In the second round, he lost to eventual champion Christian Kist 2–4.

Another remarkable achievement was throwing a nine-darter at the Denmark Open in 2008, a tournament in which he would lose the final against the Polish player Krzysztof Ratajski.

De Vos won the 2015 BDO World Trophy in Manchester. He started his run beating Rick Hofstra 6–3, and then thrashing American Jim Widmayer 6–0. On the final day, he defeated Wesley Harms in the quarter-finals, Mark McGeeney in what was a close game in the Semis, and won a last-leg decider in a classic final against Jeffrey de Graaf 10–9. This win qualified him for the 2015 Grand Slam of Darts where he exited at the group stage with defeats to Robert Thornton and Terry Jenkins. However, he still had one game to play which was against Jonny Clayton, where he threatened the world record average, finishing the match with an average of 113.86 

In 2021, De Vos won a PDC Tour Card for the first time at European Q School.

World Championship results

BDO

 2012: 2nd round (lost to Christian Kist 2–4)
 2013: 2nd round (lost to Scott Waites 1–4)
 2014: 2nd round (lost to Jan Dekker 2–4)
 2015: 2nd round (lost to Scott Mitchell 2–4)
 2016: 2nd round (lost to Scott Waites 3–4)
 2017: Quarter-final (lost to Darryl Fitton 4–5)
 2018: 2nd round (lost to Richard Veenstra 0–4)

Career finals

BDO major finals: 1 (1 title)

Performance timeline

References

External links

1981 births
Living people
Belgian darts players
British Darts Organisation players
Sportspeople from Aalst, Belgium
Professional Darts Corporation former tour card holders